Radical 135 or radical tongue meaning "tongue" is one of the 29 Kangxi radicals (214 radicals in total) composed of 6 strokes.

In the Kangxi Dictionary, there are 31 characters (out of 49,030) to be found under this radical.

 is also the 134th indexing component in the Table of Indexing Chinese Character Components predominantly adopted by Simplified Chinese dictionaries published in mainland China.

Evolution

Variant forms 
In the Kangxi Dictionary and in modern Traditional Chinese used in Hong Kong and Taiwan, this radical character begins with a horizontal stroke, while in other languages, it begins with a left-falling stroke.

Literature

External links

Unihan Database - U+820C

135
134